Soil & Health Association of New Zealand, established in 1941, is an organisation that promotes organic food and farming in New Zealand.

The organisation publishes the Organic NZ magazine.

See also
Organic farming in New Zealand
Agriculture in New Zealand

External links
Soil & Health Association of New Zealand

Agricultural organisations based in New Zealand
Organizations established in 1941
Organic farming organizations
Organic farming in New Zealand
1941 establishments in New Zealand